The WHO Regional Office for the Eastern Mediterranean is the regional office of the World Health Organization that serves 22 countries and territories in the Middle East, the North Africa, the Horn of Africa and Central Asia. It is one of the WHO's six regional offices around the world.

History
All the regional divisions of WHO were created between 1949 and 1952. They are based on article 44 of WHO's constitution, which allows the WHO to "establish a [single] regional organization to meet the special needs of [each defined] area". Many decisions are made at regional level, including importance discussions over WHO's budget, and in deciding the members of the next assembly, which are designated by the regions.

Members

The WHO Regional Office for the Eastern Mediterranean aims to work with local governments, specialized agencies, partners and other stakeholders in the field of public health to develop health policies and strengthen national health systems.

It serves the WHO Eastern Mediterranean Region, which includes 21 member states in the Middle East, North Africa, the Horn of Africa and Central Asia, as well as the occupied Palestinian territory (West Bank and Gaza Strip). The office covers an area of nearly 583 million people. The countries and territories in the WHO Regional Office for the Eastern Mediterranean are:

Location
The WHO Regional Office for the Eastern Mediterranean was originally based in Alexandria, Egypt. It was later moved to its new location in Nasr City, Cairo.

Languages

The official languages of WHO in the Eastern Mediterranean Region are Arabic, English and French. However, other national languages such as Persian, Urdu, Dari, Pashto and Somali are also used in communicating health messages and delivering health programs.

Services
Unified Arabic–English–French Medical Dictionary to help advance of Medicine and health related sciences in Arabic countries. An online version with a search engine is available.
Eastern Mediterranean Health Journal

See also
World Health Organization
Eastern Mediterranean Health Journal

References

External links
WHO Regional Office for the Eastern Mediterranean Official Website
WHO Official Website
	

Eastern Mediterranean
WHO
Organisations based in Cairo
United Nations Development Group